The 1958 DDR-Oberliga was the tenth season of the DDR-Oberliga, the first tier of league football in East Germany. Rather than in the traditional autumn-spring format the Oberliga played for six seasons from 1955 to 1960 in the calendar year format, modelled on the system used in the Soviet Union. From 1961–62 onwards the league returned to its traditional format.

The league was contested by fourteen teams. National People's Army club ASK Vorwärts Berlin won the championship, the club's first of six national East German championships. On the strength of the 1958 title Vorwärts qualified for the 1959–60 European Cup where the club was knocked out by Wolverhampton Wanderers in the preliminary round.

Helmut Müller of SC Motor Jena was the league's top scorer with 17 goals.

Table									
The 1958 season saw two newly promoted clubs, SC Dynamo Berlin and SC Empor Rostock.

Results

References

Sources

External links
 Das Deutsche Fussball Archiv  Historic German league tables

1958 domestic association football leagues
1958
Ober
Ober
Ober